Phoutdavy Phommasane (born 2 February 1994) is a Laotian professional footballer who plays as a midfielder for Master 7 FC.

External links 
 

1994 births
Living people
Laotian footballers
Laos international footballers
Association football midfielders
Footballers at the 2014 Asian Games
Asian Games competitors for Laos
Master 7 FC players